Scoparia arcta is a moth in the family Crambidae. It was described by Thomas Pennington Lucas in 1898. It is found in Australia, where it has been recorded from Queensland.

References

Moths described in 1898
Scorparia